XHEPAR-FM is a radio station on 101.5 FM in Villahermosa, Tabasco, Mexico. The station is owned by Radio Núcleo.

History

XHEPAR began as XEFRO-AM 1320 in Frontera, Tabasco. It was owned by Raúl Estrada Tsuru and received its concession on June 8, 1993.

It moved closer to Villahermosa in the 2000s, changing its calls to XEPAR-AM before moving to FM in 2010.

On January 1, 2020, Radio Núcleo handed over operation of its three Villahermosa stations to Grupo Radio Comunicación, with resulting format and name changes for all three; XHEPAR became "Estéreo Joven", retaining a pop format. After nine months, Radio Núcleo resumed direct operations and announced the return of the previous Los 40 franchise format.

References 

Radio stations in Tabasco
Villahermosa
Radio stations established in 1993